Love & Hip Hop: Hollywood is the third installment of the Love & Hip Hop reality television franchise. It premiered on September 15, 2014 on VH1 and chronicles the lives of several people in the Hollywood area, involved with hip hop music.

Series overview

Episodes

Season 1 (2014)

Season 2 (2015)

Season 3 (2016)

Season 4 (2017)

Season 5 (2018)

Season 6 (2019)

Specials

Notes

Ratings

References

Love & Hip Hop
Lists of American reality television series episodes